Castle O'er Forest is a forest south of Eskdalemuir, Dumfries and Galloway, in southern Scotland.

It is bisected by the River Esk. Eskdalemuir Forest adjoins it to the north.

References

Dumfries and Galloway
Forests and woodlands of Scotland